Kalinjar is a fortress-city in Bundelkhand, in Banda district of Uttar Pradesh, in India. It was ruled by several dynasties including the Guptas, the Vardhana Dynasty, the Chandelas, Solankis of Rewa, Mughal and the Marathas. 

The fortress has several temples dating back to the Gupta dynasty of the 3rd–5th centuries. It is strategically located on an isolated rocky hill at the end of the Vindhya Range, overlooking the plains of Bundelkhand.

History

Etymology 
Kalinjar is a portmanteau of the Sanskrit words Ka al, meaning time, and jar, meaning destruction, translating to destroyer of time.

Mythology 
Kalinjar finds its mention in ancient Hindu mythological texts. According to Hindu legends, it is said that after the Samudra manthan, when Shiva  consumed poison that turned his throat blue, he came to Kalinjar and defeated the kaal i.e. achieved victory over death. This is the reason why Shiva temple at Kalinjar is called Neelkanth (blue-throated). Since then, the hill has been considered a holy site.

Early history 
Kalinjar has also been mentioned in Buddhist literature, particularly in the travelogues of Buddha. The Chedi dynasty ruled here during the time of Gautama Buddha (563–480 BC). Following this, it was absorbed into the Maurya Empire and came to be known as Vindhya-Atavi.

The fort eventually came under the rule of the Shunga dynasty and the Pandu dynasty. In the Prayag Prasathi inscription of the Allahabad Pillar this region is mentioned by the name Vindhya Atavi. The Fort was in the control of the Gurjara Pratiharas, and remained until the rule of Nagabhatta II. Chandela rulers used to be their Mandalik kings. The mention of Kalinjar is found in almost every text or inscription of that time.

Medieval period 
According to the 16th century Persian historian Firishta, the town of Kalinjar was established by one Kedar Raja in the 7th century. Rastrakutas later seized the fortress. The fort came to prominence during the Chandela rule. According to Chandela-era legends, the fort was built by a Chandela ruler. The Chandela rulers used the title Kalanjaradhipati ("Lord of Kalanjara"), which shows their importance to the fort.

Kalinjar's historical background is replete with numerous battles and invasions. The Hindu princes of different dynasties as well as the Muslim rulers fought hard to conquer it and the fort continued to pass from one ruler to another, but except for the Mughals, no other ruler could reign over it for long.

In 1023, Mahmud of Ghazni attacked and received a tribute from Kalinjar, Mughal emperor Babur became the only commander in history to have captured the fort in 1526, when his forces drove away Raja Hasan Khan Mewatpatti. It was also the place where Sher Shah Suri met his death in 1545, when he was killed either in the fort or nearby on the grounds. In 1569, Akbar captured the fort and it was under Mughal rule until its capture by the Marathas. Kalinjar played a prominent part in history down to the time of the Revolt of 1857, when it was held by a small British garrison. Both the fort and the town, which stands at the foot of the hill, are of interest to the antiquary on account of the remains of temples, sculptures, inscriptions, and caves.

In the early 18th century, the fort was captured by the Peshwa Bajirao after defeating the Mughal general Bangash Khan of Allahabad. In order to stop the Mughals from entering Bundelkhand again, he established a Maratha light infantry huzurat of 5000 under the command of Sardar Ram Singh Bhatt, Yashwantrao Bhatt, Parshuram Bhau Bundela, Bhaskar Pandit, and Sheshrao Pant Bundela, all veterans of war and Maratha class one generals. In due course of time, the Marathas conquered the nearby territories and expanded to the Bengal frontiers. They inflicted a crushing defeat on Awadh ally Nawab of Rampur and Ala Vardi Khan.
 
The fort was used to levy chauth to nearby territories like Benares, Mirzapur, Pratapgarh, Kunda, and Bundela.

Colonial period 

In 1803, the Peshwa was involved in direct skirmishes with the East India Company in which he was defeated. In the Treaty of Surji-Anjangaon, Peshwa Bajirao II ceded Bundelkhand to the East India Company after his defeat in the Second Anglo-Maratha war. The fort came under the management of the East India Company in 1805-06. The Old Bhatt royalty was expatriated and was granted separate sanads of Kirwi, Attra, Chitrakut Mathond, and Khurand. 

The fort was placed under the pre-Maratha constitution of Bundela - Jhijhotiya Chubes. However, during the first War of Independence in 1857, The Old Bhatta Aristocracy recaptured the fort driving Bundela back to Ajaygarh. In 1858, the British attacked the fort but the people at large resisted and fought a tough battle with Major Hugh Rose. A long drawn siege ensued in which almost 800 British and 3000 Indians were killed. This proved to be the toughest battlefield in Bundelkhand where English suffered maximum casualties. The English with the help of the states of Panna and Rewa captured this fort on 4 May 1858. The Last Bhatta Peshwas surrendered and were sent to Rewa as prisoners. Kalinjar subah was distributed in between Bundela, Rewa Solanki and Chaubes of Rajaula. The fort was decommissioned and its buildings were demolished, to prevent any further maratha garrisoning at Kalinjar, thus ending the legacy of this fort. The total chauth collection was estimated at 40 lakh shahi mohars. The Naukahai campaign of Rewa and Chunar Fort, was launched directly from Kalinjar in which the Sohagpur Amarkantak and Shahdol paragana were attached to Peshwa territories. Almost all the occupants of the fort were moon worshipers and are called Chandravanshi clans of Kshatriya, Brahmanas, Kalchuries and Yadavas.

In 1812, the British troops marched into Bundelkhand, and after a long battle, they were able to annex the fort. The British seizure of Kalinjar proved to be a great watershed, transferring the legacy of the old aristocracy into the hands of the new bureaucracy of officials, who showed their loyalty to British imperialism by damaging the captured fort. The damages caused to the fort can still be seen on its walls and open spaces.

Transport links

Air

Rail

Road
The Kalinjar fort is linked by road to all the important centres in the region with regular bus services. Some of the major road distances are: Chitrakoot, ; Banda, ; Khajuraho, ; and Allahabad, .

Gallery

See also
 List of forts in Uttar Pradesh

References

Forts in Uttar Pradesh
Bundelkhand
Rajput architecture
Banda district, India